Mirza Shihab-ud-Din Muhammad Khurram  (5 January 1592 – 22 January 1666), also known as Shah Jahan I , was the fifth emperor of the Mughal Empire, reigning from January 1628 until July 1658. Under his emperorship, the Mughals reached the peak of their architectural achievements and cultural glory.

The third son of Jahangir, Shah Jahan participated in the military campaigns against the Rajputs of Mewar and the Lodis of Deccan. After Jahangir's death in October 1627, Shah Jahan defeated his youngest brother Shahryar Mirza and crowned himself emperor in the Agra Fort. In addition to Shahryar, Shah Jahan executed most of his rival claimants to the throne. He commissioned many monuments, including the Red Fort, Shah Jahan Mosque and the Taj Mahal, where his favorite wife Mumtaz Mahal is entombed. In foreign affairs, Shah Jahan presided over the aggressive campaigns against the Deccan Sultanates, the conflicts with the Portuguese, and the wars with Safavids. He also suppressed several local rebellions, and dealt with the devastating Deccan famine of 1630–32.

In September 1657, Shah Jahan was ailing from an illness and he appointed his eldest son Dara Shikoh as his successor. This nomination led to a succession crisis among his three sons, after which Shah Jahan's third son Aurangzeb emerged victorious and became the sixth emperor, executing all of his surviving brothers, including Crown Prince Dara Shikoh. After Shah Jahan returned from illness in July 1658, Aurangzeb imprisoned his father in the Agra Fort from July 1658 until his death in January 1666. He was laid to rest next to his wife in the Taj Mahal. His reign is known for doing away with the liberal policies initiated by Akbar. During Shah Jahan's time, Islamic revivalist movements like the Naqsbandi began to shape Mughal policies.

Early life

Birth and background
He was born on 5 January 1592 in Lahore, present-day Pakistan, as the ninth child and third son of Prince Salim (later known as 'Jahangir' upon his accession) by his wife, Jagat Gosain. The name Khurram was chosen for the young prince by his grandfather, Emperor Akbar, with whom the young prince shared a close relationship. Jahangir stated that Akbar was very fond of Khurram and had often told him "There is no comparison between him and your other sons. I consider him my true son."

When Khurram was born, Akbar considering him to be auspicious insisted the prince be raised in his household rather than Salim's and was thus entrusted to the care of Ruqaiya Sultan Begum. Ruqaiya assumed the primary responsibility for raising Khurram and is noted to have raised Khurram affectionately. Jahangir noted in his memoirs that Ruqaiya had loved his son, Khurram, "a thousand times more than if he had been her own [son]."

However, after the death of his grandfather Akbar in 1605, he returned to the care of his mother, Jagat Gosain whom he cared for and loved immensely. Although separated from her at birth, he had become devoted to her and had her addressed as Hazrat in court chronicles. On the death of Jagat Gosain in Akbarabad on 8 April 1619, he is recorded to be inconsolable by Jahangir and mourned for 21 days. For these three weeks of the mourning period, he attended no public meetings and subsisted on simple vegetarian meals. His consort Mumtaz Mahal personally supervised the distribution of food to the poor during this period. She led the recitation of the Quran every morning and gave her husband many lessons on the substance of life and death and begged him not to grieve.

Education
As a child, Khurram received a broad education befitting his status as a Mughal prince, which included martial training and exposure to a wide variety of cultural arts, such as poetry and music, most of which was inculcated, according to court chroniclers, by Jahangir. According to his chronicler Qazvini, prince Khurram was only familiar with a few Turki words and showed little interest in the study of the language as a child. Khurram was attracted to Hindi literature since his childhood, and his Hindi letters were mentioned in his father's biography, Tuzuk-e-Jahangiri. In 1605, as Akbar lay on his deathbed, Khurram, who at this point of time was 13, remained by his bedside and refused to move even after his mother tried to retrieve him. Given the politically uncertain times immediately preceding Akbar's death, Khurram was in a fair amount of physical danger from political opponents of his father. He was at last ordered to return to his quarters by the senior women of his grandfather's household, namely Salima Sultan Begum and his grandmother Mariam-uz-Zamani as Akbar's health deteriorated.

Khusrau rebellion
In 1605, his father succeeded to the throne, after crushing a rebellion by Prince Khusrau – Khurram remained distant from court politics and intrigues in the immediate aftermath of that event. Khurram left Ruqaiya's care and returned to his mother's care. As the third son, Khurram did not challenge the two major power blocs of the time, his father's and his half-brother's; thus, he enjoyed the benefits of imperial protection and luxury while being allowed to continue with his education and training. This relatively quiet and stable period of his life allowed Khurram to build his own support base in the Mughal court, which would be useful later on in his life.

Jahangir assigned Khurram to guard the palace and treasury while he went to pursue Khusrau. He was later ordered to bring Mariam-uz-Zamani who was his grandmother and Jahangir's harem to him.

During Khusrau's second rebellion, Khurram's informants informed him about Fatehullah, Nuruddin and Muhammad Sharif gathered around 500 men at Khusrau's instigation and lay await for the Emperor. Khurram relayed this information to Jahangir who praised him.

Jahangir had Khurram weighed against gold, silver and other wealth at his mansion at Orta.

Nur Jahan
Due to the long period of tensions between his father and his half-brother, Khusrau Mirza, Khurram began to drift closer to his father, and over time, started to be considered the de facto heir-apparent by court chroniclers. This status was given official sanction when Jahangir granted the sarkar of Hissar-Feroza, which had traditionally been the fief of the heir-apparent, to Khurram in 1608. Nur Jahan gradually after her marriage to Jahangir in the year 1611, became an active participant in the decisions made by Jahangir. Slowly, while Jahangir became more indulgent in wine and opium, she was considered to be the actual power behind the throne. Her near and dear relatives acquired important positions in the Mughal court, termed the Nur Jahan junta by historians. Khurram was in constant conflict with his stepmother, Nur Jahan who favoured her son-in-law Shahryar Mirza for the succession to the Mughal throne over him. She tried to weaken his position in the Mughal court by sending him on campaigns far in Deccan while ensuring several favours were being bestowed on her son-in-law. Khurram after sensing the danger posed to his status as heir-apparent rebelled against his father in 1622 but did not succeed and eventually lost the favour of his father. A year before Jahangir's death in 1627, coins began to be struck containing Nur Jahan's name along with Jahangir's name. After the death of Jahangir in 1627, a feud followed between Khurram and his half-brother, Shahryar Mirza for the succession to the Mughal throne. Khurram won the battle of succession and became the fifth Mughal Emperor. Nur Jahan was subsequently deprived of her imperial stature, privileges and economic grants and was put under house arrest on the orders of Khurram and led a quiet life till her death.

Marriages

In 1607, Khurram became engaged to Arjumand Banu Begum (1593–1631), who is also known as Mumtaz Mahal (Persian for "the chosen one of the Palace"). They were about 14 and 15 when they were engaged, and five years later, got married.  The young girl belonged to an illustrious Persian noble family that had been serving Mughal emperors since the reign of Akbar. The family's patriarch was Mirza Ghiyas Beg, who was also known by his title I'timād-ud-Daulah or "Pillar of the State". He had been Jahangir's finance minister and his son, Asaf Khan – Arjumand Banu's father – played an important role in the Mughal court, eventually serving as Chief Minister. Her aunt Mehr-un-Nissa later became the Empress Nur Jahan, chief wife of Emperor Jahangir.

The prince would have to wait five years before he was married in 1612 (1021 AH), on a date selected by the court astrologers as most conducive to ensuring a happy marriage. This was an unusually long engagement for the time. However, Shah Jahan first married Princess Kandahari Begum, the daughter of a great-grandson of Shah Ismail I of Persia, with whom he had a daughter, his first child.

In 1612, aged 20, Khurram married Mumtaz Mahal, on a date chosen by court astrologers. The marriage was a happy one and Khurram remained devoted to her. She bore him fourteen children, out of whom seven survived into adulthood.

Though there was genuine love between the two, Arjumand Banu Begum was a politically astute woman and served as a crucial advisor and confidante to her husband. Later on, as empress, Mumtaz Mahal wielded immense power, such as being consulted by her husband in state matters and being responsible for the imperial seal, which allowed her to review official documents in their final draft.

Mumtaz Mahal died at age 38 (7 June 1631), upon giving birth to Gauhar Ara Begum in Burhanpur, of a postpartum haemorrhage, which caused considerable blood-loss after painful labor of thirty hours. Contemporary historians note that Princess Jahanara, aged 17, was so distressed by her mother's pain that she started distributing gems to the poor, hoping for divine intervention, and Shah Jahan was noted as being "paralysed by grief" and weeping fits. Her body was temporarily buried in a walled pleasure garden known as Zainabad, originally constructed by Shah Jahan's uncle Prince Daniyal along the Tapti River. Her death had a profound impact on Shah Jahan's personality and inspired the construction of the Taj Mahal, where she was later reburied.

Khurram had taken other wives, among whom were Kandahari Begum (m. 28 October 1610) and Izz un-Nisa Begum (m. 2 September 1617), the daughters of Muzaffar Husain Mirza Safawi and Shahnawaz Khan, son of Abdul Rahim Khan-I-Khana, respectively. But according to court chroniclers, these marriages were more out of political consideration, and they enjoyed only the status of being royal wives.

Khurram is also recorded to have married his maternal half-cousin, Lilavati Bai, daughter of Sakat Singh Rathore of Kharwa. The marriage took place when Khurram was in rebellion against his father, Jahangir.

Accusation of incest

Francois Bernier, a French physician who visited India from 1659 to 1668, recorded that the relationship of Shah Jahan with his daughter, Jahanara Begum, exceeded basic decency as it was rumoured that they were in an incestuous relationship. Similar such claims are also alleged by De laet, Peter Mundy and Tavernier. Based on this Historian Vincent Smith also argues for the same thing. But as Historian B P Saksena shows, there is no support for such a claim. Niccolao Manucci who was a contemporary of Bernier, who otherwise talks freely about the aberrations and love affairs of Jahanara repudiates his charge of incest and says:
 She (Jahanara) served him with great diligence and love in order that her father should accede to her petitions (To marry). It was from this cause that the Common people hinted that she had intercourse with her father and this gave occasion to Monsieur Bernier to write a lot of things about this princess, founded entirely on the talks of Low people

Further Manucci also says that what Bernier writes was also untrue. As asserted by Historian K. S. Lal, the rumour was fed by the malice of the courtiers and the verdict of the Mullas. Aurangzeb’s confining of Jahanara in the Agra Fort with the Royal prisoner and the talk of the low people. All these circumstances point to Aurangzeb's involvement in magnifying a rumour into a full-fledged scandal. Right from the beginning the relations between Dara and Aurangzeb were not cordial and Jahanara was a partisan of Dara. During the war of Succession, the nobles and courtiers had been divided into two camps in support of the two princes. When Aurangzeb won the throne the number of his supporters swelled. Mullas were also close to Aurangzeb. It was thus possible that with the verdict of the Maulanas, Aurengzeb was seeking to destroy the images of both Shah Jahan and Jahanara at the same time.

Early military campaigns 

Prince Khurram showed extraordinary military talent. The first occasion for Khurram to test his military prowess was during the Mughal campaign against the Rajput state of Mewar, which had been a hostile force to the Mughals since Akbar's reign. In December 1613 at an auspicious hour, Prince Khurram was adorned with various, including the and sent to Mewar.

After a year of a harsh war of attrition, Rana Amar Singh I surrendered conditionally to the Mughal forces and became a vassal state of the Mughal Empire. In 1615, Khurram presented Kunwar Karan Singh, Amar Singh's heir to Jahangir. Khurram was sent to pay homage to his mother and stepmothers and was later awarded by Jahangir. The same year, his mansab was increased from 12000/6000 to 15000/7000, to equal that his brother Parvez's and was further increased to 20000/10000 in 1616.

In 1616, on Khurram's departure to Deccan, Jahangir awarded him the title Shah Sultan Khurram.

In 1617, Khurram was directed to deal with the Lodis in the Deccan to secure the Empire's southern borders and to restore imperial control over the region. On his return 1617 after successes in these campaigns, Khurram performed koronush before Jahangir who called him to jharoka and rose from his seat to embrace him. Jahangir also granting him the title of Shah Jahan (Persian: "King of the World") and raised his military rank to 30000/20000 and allowed him a special throne in his Durbar, an unprecedented honor for a prince. Edward S. Holden writes, "He was flattered by some, envied by others, loved by none."

In 1618, Shah Jahan was given the first copy of Jahangirnama by his father who considered him "the first of all my sons in everything."

Rebel prince

Inheritance of food and water in the Mughal Empire was not determined through Coparcenary, but by princely sons competing to achieve military successes and consolidating their power at court. This often led to rebellions and wars of succession. As a result, a complex political climate surrounded the Mughal court in Khurram's formative years. In 1611 his father married Nur Jahan, the widowed daughter of a Persian noble. She rapidly became an important member of Jahangir's court and, together with her brother Asaf Khan, wielded considerable influence. Arjumand was Asaf Khan's daughter and her marriage to Khurram consolidated Nur Jahan and Asaf Khan's positions in court.

Court intrigues, however, including Nur Jahan's decision to have her daughter from her first marriage wed Prince Khurram's youngest brother Shahzada Shahryar and her support for his claim to the throne led to much internal division. Prince Khurram resented the influence Nur Jahan held over his father and was angered at having to play second fiddle to her favourite Shahryar, his half-brother and her son-in-law. When the Persians besieged Kandahar, Nur Jahan was at the helm of the affairs. She ordered Prince Khurram to march for Kandahar, but he refused. As a result of Prince Khurram's refusal to obey Nur Jahan's orders, Kandahar was lost to the Persians after a forty-five-day siege. Prince Khurram feared that in his absence Nur Jahan would attempt to poison his father against him and convince Jahangir to name Shahryar the heir in his place. This fear brought Prince Khurram to rebel against his father rather than fight against the Persians.

In 1622, Prince Khurram raised an army and marched against his father and Nur Jahan. He was defeated at Bilochpur in March 1623. Later he took refuge in Udaipur Mewar with Maharana Karan Singh II. He was first lodged in Delwada Ki Haveli and subsequently shifted to Jagmandir Palace on his request. Prince Khurram exchanged his turban with the Maharana and that turban is still preserved in Pratap Museum, Udaipur (R V Somani 1976). It is believed that the mosaic work of Jagmandir inspired him to use mosaic work in the Taj Mahal of Agra. In November 1623, he found safe asylum in Bengal Subah after he was driven from Agra and the Deccan. He advanced through Midnapur and Burdwan. At Akbarnagar, he defeated and killed the then Subahdar of Bengal, Ibrahim Khan Fath-i-Jang, on 20 April 1624. He entered Dhaka and "all the elephants, horses, and 4,000,000 rupees in specie belonging to the Government were delivered to him". After a short stay he then moved to Patna. His rebellion did not succeed in the end and he was forced to submit unconditionally after he was defeated near Allahabad. Although the prince was forgiven for his errors in 1626, tensions between Nur Jahan and her stepson continued to grow beneath the surface.

Upon the death of Jahangir in 1627, the wazir Asaf Khan, who had long been a quiet partisan of Prince Khurram, acted with unexpected forcefulness and determination to forestall his sister's plans to place Prince Shahryar on the throne. He put Nur Jahan in close confinement. He obtained control of Prince Khurram's three sons who were under her charge. Asaf Khan also managed palace intrigues to ensure Prince Khurram's succession to the throne. Prince Khurram succeeded to the Mughal throne as Abu ud-Muzaffar Shihab ud-Din Mohammad Sahib ud-Quiran ud-Thani Shah Jahan Padshah Ghazi (Urdu: شهاب الدین محمد خرم), or Shah Jahan.

His regnal name is divided into various parts. Shihab ud-Din, meaning "Star of the Faith", Sahib al-Quiran ud-Thani, meaning "Second Lord of the Happy Conjunction of Jupiter and Venus". Shah Jahan, meaning "King of the World", alluding to his pride in his Timurid roots and his ambitions. More epithets showed his secular and religious duties. He was also Khalifat Panahi ("Refuge of the Caliphate"), but Zill-i Allahi, or the "Shadow of God on Earth".

His first act as ruler was to execute his chief rivals and imprison his stepmother Nur Jahan. Upon Shah Jahan's orders, several executions took place on 23 January 1628. Those put to death included his brother Shahryar; his nephews Dawar and Garshasp, sons of Shah Jahan's previously executed brother Prince Khusrau; and his cousins Tahmuras and Hoshang, sons of the late Prince Daniyal Mirza.
This allowed Shah Jahan to rule his empire without contention.

Reign

Administration of the Mughal Empire

Evidence from the reign of Shah Jahan states that in 1648 the army consisted of 911,400 infantry, musketeers, and artillery men, and 185,000 Sowars commanded by princes and nobles.

His cultural and political initial steps have been described as a type of the Timurid Renaissance, in which he built historical and political bonds with his Timurid heritage mainly via his numerous unsuccessful military campaigns on his ancestral region of Balkh. In various forms, Shah Jahan appropriated his Timurid background and grafted it onto his imperial legacy.

During his reign the Marwari horse  was introduced, becoming Shah Jahan's favorite, and various Mughal cannons were mass-produced in the Jaigarh Fort. Under his rule, the empire became a huge military machine and the nobles and their contingents multiplied almost fourfold, as did the demands for more revenue from their citizens. But due to his measures in the financial and commercial fields, it was a period of general stability—the administration was centralized and court affairs systematized.

The Mughal Empire continued to expand moderately during his reign as his sons commanded large armies on different fronts. India at the time was a rich center of the arts, crafts and architecture, and some of the best of the architects, artisans, craftsmen, painters and writers of the world resided in Shah Jahan's empire. According to economist Angus Maddison, Mughal-era India's share of global gross domestic product (GDP) grew from 22.7% in 1600 to 24.4% in 1700, surpassing China to become the world's largest. E. Dewick and Murray Titus, quoting Badshahnama, write that 76 temples in Benares were demolished on Shah Jahan's orders.

Famine of 1630

A famine broke out in 1630–32 in Deccan, Gujarat and Khandesh as a result of three main crop failures. Two million died of starvation, grocers sold dogs' flesh and mixed powdered bones with flour. Parents ate their own children. Some villages were completely destroyed, their streets filled with human corpses. In response to the devastation, Shah Jahan set up langar (free kitchens) for the victims of the famine.

Successful military campaigns against Deccan Sultanates

In 1632, Shah Jahan captured the fortress at Daulatabad, Maharashtra and imprisoned Husein Shah of the Nizam Shahi Kingdom of Ahmednagar. Golconda submitted in 1635 and then Bijapur in 1636. Shah Jahan appointed Aurangzeb as Viceroy of the Deccan, consisting of Khandesh, Berar, Telangana, and Daulatabad. During his viceroyalty, Aurangzeb conquered Baglana, then Golconda in 1656, and then Bijapur in 1657.

Sikh rebellion led by Guru Hargobind
A rebellion of the Sikhs led by Guru Hargobind took place and in return, Shah Jahan ordered their destruction Although Guru Hargobind Shahib defeated Mughals army in Battle of Amritsar, Battle of Kartarpur, Battle of Rohilla, Battle of Lahira

Relations with the Safavid dynasty

Shah Jahan and his sons captured the city of Kandahar in 1638 from the Safavids, prompting the retaliation of the Persians led by their ruler Abbas II of Persia, who recaptured it in 1649. The Mughal armies were unable to recapture it despite repeated sieges during the Mughal–Safavid War. Shah Jahan also expanded the Mughal Empire to the west beyond the Khyber Pass to Ghazna and Kandahar.

Military Campaign in Central Asia

Shah Jahan launched an invasion of Central Asia in 1646-1647.

Relations with the Ottoman Empire
Shah Jahan sent an embassy to the Ottoman court in 1637. Led by Mir Zarif, it reached Sultan Murad IV the following year, while he was encamped in Baghdad. Zarif presented him with fine gifts and a letter which encouraged an alliance against Safavid Persia. The Sultan sent a return embassy led by Arsalan Agha. Shah Jahan received the ambassador in June 1640. They exchanged lavish presents, but Shah Jahan was displeased with Sultan Murad's return letter, the tone of which he found discourteous. Sultan Murad's successor, Sultan Ibrahim, sent Shah Jahan another letter encouraging him to wage war against the Persians, but there is no record of a reply.

War with Portuguese
Shah Jahan gave orders in 1631 to Qasim Khan, the Mughal viceroy of Bengal, to drive out the Portuguese from their trading post at Port Hoogly. The post was heavily armed with cannons, battleships, fortified walls, and other instruments of war. The Portuguese were accused of trafficking by high Mughal officials and due to commercial competition the Mughal-controlled port of Saptagram began to slump. Shah Jahan was particularly outraged by the activities of Jesuits in that region, notably when they were accused of abducting peasants. On 25 September 1632, the Mughal Army raised imperial banners and gained control over the Bandel region, and the garrison was punished. On 23 December 1635, Shah Jahan issued a farman ordering the Agra Church to be demolished. The Church was occupied by the Portuguese Jesuits. However the Emperor allowed the Jesuits to conduct their religious ceremonies in privacy. He also banned the Jesuits in preaching their religion and making converts from both Hindus and Muslims.

Indian Ocean fleet 

By the reign of Shah Jahan the navy of the Mughal Empire was based at Kozhikode, ready to secure the Indian Ocean trade that was vital to the economy of India.

Ministers
Shah Jahan's treasurer was Sheikh Farid, who founded the city of Faridabad.

Revolts against Shah Jahan 
The Kolis of Gujarat were most rebellious under the rule of Shah Jahan. In 1622, Shah Jahan sent Raja Vikramjit who was Governor of Gujarat to subdue the Kolis of Ahmedabad. Between 1632 and 1635, four viceroys were appointed due to they could not manage the Koli activities well. Kolis of Kankrej in North Gujarat committed excesses and the Jam of Nawanagar did not paid the tribute. Soon Azam Khan was appointed who put the province in order by subduing the Kolis. Azam Khan marched against Koli rebels, When Ázam Khán reached Sidhpur, the merchants complained bitterly of the outrages of one Kánji, a Chunvalia Koli, who had been especially daring in plundering merchandise and committing highway robberies. Ázam Khán, anxious to start with a show of vigour, before proceeding to Áhmedábád, marched against Kánji, who fled to the village of Bhádar near Kheralu, sixty miles north-east of Áhmedábád. Ázam Khán pursued him so hotly that Kánji surrendered, handed over his plunder, and gave security not only that he would not again commit robberies, but that he would pay an annual tribute of Rupees 10,000. Ázam Khán then built two fortified posts in the Koli country, naming one Ázamábád after himself, and the other Khalílábád after his son and He also made the Jam of Nawanagar surrender. The next viceroy Ísa Tarkhán carried out financial reforms. In 1644, the Mughal prince Aurangzeb was appointed as the viceroy who was engaged in religious disputes for destroying a Jain temple in Ahmedabad. Due to his disputes, he was replaced by Shaista Khan who failed to subdue Kolis. So the prince Murad Bakhsh was appointed as the viceroy in 1654. He restored the disorder soon and defeated the Koli rebels.

Illness and death

When Shah Jahan became ill in 1658, Dara Shikoh (Mumtaz Mahal's eldest son) assumed the role of regent in his father's stead, which swiftly incurred the animosity of his brothers. Upon learning of his assumption of the regency, his younger brothers, Shuja, Viceroy of Bengal, and Murad Baksh, Viceroy of Gujarat, declared their independence and marched upon Agra in order to claim their riches. Aurangzeb, the third son, gathered a well-trained army and became its chief commander. He faced Dara's army near Agra and defeated him during the Battle of Samugarh. Although Shah Jahan fully recovered from his illness, Aurangzeb declared him incompetent to rule and put him under house arrest in Agra Fort.

Jahanara Begum Sahib, Mumtaz Mahal's eldest surviving daughter, voluntarily shared his 8-year confinement and nursed him in his dotage. In January 1666, Shah Jahan fell ill. Confined to bed, he became progressively weaker until, on 30 January, he commended the ladies of the imperial court, particularly his consort of later years Akbarabadi Mahal, to the care of Jahanara. After reciting the Kal'ma (Laa ilaaha ill allah) and verses from the Quran, Shah Jahan died, aged 74.

Shah Jahan's chaplain Sayyid Muhammad Qanauji and Kazi Qurban of Agra came to the fort, moved his body to a nearby hall, washed it, enshrouded it, and put it in a coffin of sandalwood.

Princess Jahanara had planned a state funeral which was to include a procession with Shah Jahan's body carried by eminent nobles followed by the notable citizens of Agra and officials scattering coins for the poor and needy. Aurangzeb refused to accommodate such ostentation. The body was taken to the Taj Mahal and was interred there next to the body of his beloved wife Mumtaz Mahal.

Contributions to architecture

Shah Jahan left behind a grand legacy of structures constructed during his reign. He was one of the greatest patrons of Mughal architecture. His reign ushered in the golden age of Mughal architecture. His most famous building was the Taj Mahal, which he built out of love for his wife, the empress Mumtaz Mahal. His relationship with Mumtaz Mahal has been heavily adapted into Indian art, literature and cinema. Shah Jahan personally owned the royal treasury, and several precious stones such as the Kohinoor.

Its structure was drawn with great care and architects from all over the world were called for this purpose. The building took twenty years to complete and was constructed from white marble underlaid with brick.  Upon his death, his son Aurangzeb had him interred in it next to Mumtaz Mahal. Among his other constructions are the Red Fort also called the Delhi Fort or Lal Qila in Urdu, large sections of Agra Fort, the Jama Masjid, the Wazir Khan Mosque, the Moti Masjid, the Shalimar Gardens, sections of the Lahore Fort, the Mahabat Khan Mosque in Peshawar, the Mini Qutub Minar in Hastsal, the Jahangir mausoleum—his father's tomb, the construction of which was overseen by his stepmother Nur Jahan and the Shahjahan Mosque. He also had the Peacock Throne, Takht e Taus, made to celebrate his rule. Shah Jahan also placed profound verses of the Quran on his masterpieces of architecture.

The Shah Jahan Mosque in Thatta, Sindh province of Pakistan (100 km / 60 miles from Karachi) was built during the reign of Shah Jahan in 1647. The mosque is built with red bricks with blue coloured glaze tiles probably imported from another Sindh's town of Hala. The mosque has overall 93 domes and it is the world's largest mosque having such a number of domes. It has been built keeping acoustics in mind. A person speaking inside one end of the dome can be heard at the other end when the speech exceeds 100 decibels. It has been on the tentative UNESCO World Heritage list since 1993.

Coins
Shah Jahan continued striking coins in three metals i.e. gold (mohur), silver (rupee) and copper (dam). His pre-accession coins bear the name Khurram.

Issue

See also
 Shah Jahan II
 Shah Jahan III
 Wine cup of Shah Jahan
 Shahjehan, 1946 Indian film about the emperor

References

Notes

Bibliography

External links

 Shah Jehan in Christian Art
 Shah Jahan's 353rd death anniversary observed at Taj Mahal at TwoCircles.net
 History of Islam in India at IndiaNest.com
 Shah Jahan's Coin Database
 Shah Jahan

Taj Mahal
Mughal emperors
1592 births
1666 deaths
People from Agra
17th-century Indian monarchs
17th-century Indian Muslims
Agra
History books about the 17th century
People from Lahore
Subahdars of Gujarat